Franz Schubert's compositions of 1816 are mostly in the Deutsch catalogue (D) range D 331–510, and include:
 Instrumental works:
 Symphony No. 4, D 417
 Symphony No. 5, D 485
 Rondo in A major for Violin and Strings, D 438
 Adagio and Rondo concertante in F major, D 487
 String Quartet No. 11, D 353
 String Trio, D 471
 Piano Sonata in E major, D 459
 Vocal music:
 Mass No. 4, D 452
 Magnificat, D 486
 Stabat Mater in F minor, D 383
 Gesänge des Harfners aus "Wilhelm Meister", D 478
 "Sehnsucht", D 359
 "Der König in Thule", D 367
 "Mignon", D 469
 "Sehnsucht", D 481
 "Der Wanderer", D 489
 "Wiegenlied", D 498

Table

Legend

List

|-
| data-sort-value="331" | 331332
| 331
| data-sort-value="XXX,1866" | (1866)
| data-sort-value="1600,038" | XVINo. 38
| data-sort-value="304,31" | III, 4No. 31
| data-sort-value="Entfernten, Der, D 331" | Der Entfernten, D 331
| data-sort-value="text Wohl denk' ich allenthalben 1" | Wohl denk' ich allenthalben
| data-sort-value="1816-01-01" | 
| data-sort-value="Text by Salis-Seewis, Johann Gaudenz von, Wohl denk' ich allenthalben 1" | Text by Salis-Seewis; For ttbb; Identical to former 
|-
| 333
| data-sort-value="999.0796" | 796
| data-sort-value="ZZZZ" |

| data-sort-value="ZZZZ" |

| data-sort-value="ZZZZ" |

| Laß dein Vertrauen nicht schwinden
| data-sort-value="ZZZZ" |

| data-sort-value="ZZZZ" |

| Part of  No. 21
|-
| 334
| 334
| data-sort-value="XXX,1897" | (1897)
| data-sort-value="2103,024" | XXI, 3No. 24
| data-sort-value="724,00" | VII/2, 4
| Minuet with Trio, D 334
| data-sort-value="key A major E major" | A major (minuet) / E major (trio)
| data-sort-value="1815-09-20" | beforefall 1815
| For piano
|-
| 335
| 335
| data-sort-value="XXX,1897" | (1897)
| data-sort-value="2103,025" | XXI, 3No. 25
| data-sort-value="726,00" | VII/2, 6
| Minuet with two Trios
| data-sort-value="key E major" | E major
| data-sort-value="1813-01-01" | 1813?
| For piano
|-
| 337
| 337
| data-sort-value="XXX,1860" | (1860)
| data-sort-value="1600,039" | XVINo. 39
| data-sort-value="304,32" | III, 4No. 32
| data-sort-value="Einsiedelei, Die, D 337" | Die Einsiedelei, D 337, a.k.a. Lob der Einsamkeit
| data-sort-value="text Es rieselt klar und wehend ein Quell 1" | Es rieselt klar und wehend ein Quell
| data-sort-value="1816-01-01" | 
| data-sort-value="Text by Salis-Seewis, Johann Gaudenz von, Es rieselt klar und wehend ein Quell 1" | Text by Salis-Seewis (other settings:  and 563); For ttbb
|-
| 338
| 338
| data-sort-value="XXX,1891" | (1891)
| data-sort-value="1600,040" | XVINo. 40
| data-sort-value="304,33" | III, 4No. 33
| data-sort-value="An den Fruhling, D 338" | An den Frühling, D 338
| data-sort-value="text Willkommen, schoner Jungling! 2" | Willkommen, schöner Jüngling!
| data-sort-value="1816-01-01" | 
| data-sort-value="Text by Schiller, Friedrich, Willkommen, schoner Jungling! 2" | Text by Schiller (other settings:  and 587); For ttbb
|-
| 342
| 342
| data-sort-value="XXX,1885" | (1885)
| data-sort-value="2004,238" | XX, 4No. 238
| data-sort-value="410,00" | IV, 10
| An mein Klavier a.k.a. Seraphine an ihr Klavier
| data-sort-value="text Sanftes Klavier, welche Entzuckungen schaffest du mir" | Sanftes Klavier, welche Entzückungen schaffest du mir
| data-sort-value="1816-01-01" | 
| data-sort-value="Text by Schubart, Christian Friedrich Daniel, Sanftes Klavier, welche Entzuckungen schaffest du mir" | Text by Schubart
|-
| 343
| 343
| data-sort-value="XXX,1831" | (1831)
| data-sort-value="2005,342" | XX, 5No. 342
| data-sort-value="410,00" | IV, 10
| Am Tage Aller Seelen a.k.a. Litanei auf das Fest Aller Seelen
| data-sort-value="text Ruh'n in Frieden alle Seelen" | Ruh'n in Frieden alle Seelen
| data-sort-value="1816-08-01" | August1816
| data-sort-value="Text by Jacobi, Johann Georg, Ruh'n in Frieden alle Seelen" | Text by Jacobi; Two versions: 1st, in AGA, publ. in 1831
|-
| 344
| 344
| data-sort-value="ZZZZ" |
| data-sort-value="ZZZZ" |
| data-sort-value="410,00" | IV, 10
| Am ersten Maimorgen
| data-sort-value="text Heute will ich frohlich sein" | Heute will ich fröhlich sein
| data-sort-value="1816-01-01" | 1816?
| data-sort-value="Text by Claudius, Matthias, Heute will ich frohlich sein" | Text by Claudius
|-
| 345
| 345
| data-sort-value="XXX,1897" | (1897)
| data-sort-value="2101,003" | XXI, 1No. 3
| data-sort-value="507,01" | V, 7 No. 1
| data-sort-value="Violin Concerto" | Violin Concerto, a.k.a. Konzertstück (Concert Piece)
| data-sort-value="key D major" | D major
| data-sort-value="1816-01-01" | 1816
| Adagio, Allegro
|-
| 346
| 346
| data-sort-value="XXX,1897" | (1897)
| data-sort-value="2103,017" | XXI, 3No. 17
| data-sort-value="724,00" | VII/2, 4 Anh.
| Allegretto, D 346
| data-sort-value="key C major" | C major
| data-sort-value="1816-01-01" | 1816?
| For piano; Fragment; 4th movement of ?
|-
| 347
| 347
| data-sort-value="XXX,1897" | (1897)
| data-sort-value="2103,018" | XXI, 3No. 18
| data-sort-value="724,00" | VII/2, 4 Anh.
| Allegro moderato, D 347
| data-sort-value="key C major" | C major
| data-sort-value="1813-01-01" | 1813?
| For piano; Fragment
|-
| 348
| 348
| data-sort-value="XXX,1897" | (1897)
| data-sort-value="2103,019" | XXI, 3No. 19
| data-sort-value="724,00" | VII/2, 4 Anh.
| Andantino, D 348
| data-sort-value="key C major" | C major
| data-sort-value="1816-01-01" | 1816?
| For piano; Fragment
|-
| 349
| 349
| data-sort-value="XXX,1897" | (1897)
| data-sort-value="2103,021" | XXI, 3No. 21
| data-sort-value="724,00" | VII/2, 4 Anh.
| Adagio, D 349
| data-sort-value="key C major" | C major
| data-sort-value="1816-01-01" | 1816?
| For piano; Fragment
|-
| 350
| 350
| data-sort-value="XXX,1885" | (1885)
| data-sort-value="2004,203" | XX, 4No. 203
| data-sort-value="410,00" | IV, 10
| data-sort-value="Entfernten, Der, D 350" | Der Entfernten, D 350
| data-sort-value="text Wohl denk' ich allenthalben 2" | Wohl denk' ich allenthalben
| data-sort-value="1816-01-01" | 1816?
| data-sort-value="Text by Salis-Seewis, Johann Gaudenz von, Wohl denk' ich allenthalben 2" | Text by Salis-Seewis
|-
| 351
| 351
| data-sort-value="XXX,1895" | (1895)
| data-sort-value="2004,204" | XX, 4No. 204
| data-sort-value="411,00" | IV, 11
| Fischerlied, D 351
| data-sort-value="text Das Fischergewerbe gibt rustigen Mut 1" | Das Fischergewerbe gibt rüstigen Mut
| data-sort-value="1816-01-01" | 1816?
| data-sort-value="Text by Salis-Seewis, Johann Gaudenz von, Das Fischergewerbe gibt rustigen Mut 1" | Text by Salis-Seewis (other settings:  and 562)
|-
| 352
| 352
| data-sort-value="XXX,1847" | (1847)
| data-sort-value="2004,286" | XX, 4No. 286
| data-sort-value="302,21" | III, 2bNo. 21
| Licht und Liebe a.k.a. Nachtgesang
| data-sort-value="text Liebe ist ein susses Licht" | Liebe ist ein süßes Licht
| data-sort-value="1816-01-01" | 1816?
| data-sort-value="Text by Collin, Matthaus Casimir von, Liebe ist ein susses Licht" | Text by Collin, M. C.; For st and piano
|-
| 353
| 353
| data-sort-value="125,1840-2" | 125p,2(1840)
| data-sort-value="0500,011" | V No. 11
| data-sort-value="604,12" | VI, 4No. 12
| data-sort-value="String Quartet, D 353" | String Quartet No. 11
| data-sort-value="key E major" | E major
| data-sort-value="1816-01-01" | 1816
| Allegro con fuoco – Andante – Minuet – Rondo
|-
| 354
| 354
| data-sort-value="XXX,1930" | (1930)
| data-sort-value="ZZZZ" |
| data-sort-value="609,00" | VI, 9
| data-sort-value="Komische Landler, 4" | Four Komische Ländler
| data-sort-value="key D major" | D major
| data-sort-value="1816-01-01" | January1816
| For two violins
|-
| 355
| 355
| data-sort-value="XXX,1928" | (1928)
| data-sort-value="ZZZZ" |
| data-sort-value="609,00" | VI, 9
| data-sort-value="Landler, 08, D 355" | Eight Ländler, D 355
| data-sort-value="key F-sharp minor" | F minor
| data-sort-value="1816-01-01" | January1816
| For violin(?)
|-
| 356
| 356
| data-sort-value="XXX,1844" | (1844)
| data-sort-value="ZZZZ" |
| data-sort-value="303,73" | III, 3 Anh. II No. 3
| data-sort-value="Trinklied, D 356" | Trinklied, D 356
| data-sort-value="text Funkelnd im Becher so helle" | Funkelnd im Becher so helle, so hold
| data-sort-value="1816-01-01" | 1816
| For vocal soloist, TTBB and piano; Piano part lost (by Czerny in 1844 ed.)
|-
| 357
| 357
| data-sort-value="XXX,1892" | (1892)
| data-sort-value="1900,024" | XIXNo. 24
| data-sort-value="304,35" | III, 4 No. 35VIII, 2 No. 28
| Goldner Schein
| data-sort-value="text Goldner Schein deckt den Hain" | Goldner Schein deckt den Hain
| data-sort-value="1816-05-01" | 1/5/1816
| data-sort-value="Text by Matthisson, Friedrich von, Goldner Schein deckt den Hain" | Text by Matthisson; Canon for three voices
|-
| 358
| 358
| data-sort-value="XXX,1849" | (1849)
| data-sort-value="2004,235" | XX, 4No. 235
| data-sort-value="410,00" | IV, 10
| data-sort-value="Nacht, Die, D 358" | Die Nacht, D 358
| data-sort-value="text Du verstorst uns nicht, o Nacht!" | Du verstörst uns nicht, o Nacht!
| data-sort-value="1816-01-01" | 1816
| data-sort-value="Text by Uz, Johann, Du verstorst uns nicht, o Nacht!" | Text by Uz
|-
| 359
| 359
| data-sort-value="XXX,1872" | (1872)
| data-sort-value="2004,260" | XX, 4No. 260
| data-sort-value="403,00" | IV, 3
| data-sort-value="Sehnsucht, D 359" | Sehnsucht, D 359 a.k.a. Lied der Mignon
| data-sort-value="text Nur wer die Sehnsucht kennt 2" | Nur wer die Sehnsucht kennt
| data-sort-value="1816-01-01" | 1816
| data-sort-value="Text by Goethe, Johann Wolfgang von from Wilhelm Meister's Apprenticeship, Nur wer die Sehnsucht kennt 2" | Text by Goethe, from Wilhelm Meister's Apprenticeship (other settings: , 481, 656 and 877 Nos. 1 & 4)
|-
| 360
| 360
| data-sort-value="065,1826-1" | 65,1(1826)
| data-sort-value="2004,268" | XX, 4No. 268
| data-sort-value="403,00" | IV, 3
| Lied eines Schiffers an die Dioskuren
| data-sort-value="text Dioskuren, Zwillingssterne" | Dioskuren, Zwillingssterne
| data-sort-value="1816-01-01" | 1816
| data-sort-value="Text by Mayrhofer, Johann, Dioskuren, Zwillingssterne" | Text by Mayrhofer
|-
| 361
| 361
| data-sort-value="109,1829-1" | 109p,1(1829)
| data-sort-value="2004,272" | XX, 4No. 272
| data-sort-value="410,00" | IV, 10
| data-sort-value="Am Bach im Fruhling" | Am Bach im Frühling
| data-sort-value="text Du brachst sie nun, die kalte Rinde" | Du brachst sie nun, die kalte Rinde
| data-sort-value="1816-01-01" | 1816
| data-sort-value="Text by Schober, Franz von, Du brachst sie nun, die kalte Rinde" | Text by Schober; Piano intro probably not by Schubert
|-
| 362
| 362
| data-sort-value="XXX,1895" | (1895)
| data-sort-value="2004,280" | XX, 4No. 280
| data-sort-value="411,00" | IV, 11
| Zufriedenheit, D 362, a.k.a. Lied
| data-sort-value="text Ich bin vergnugt 1" | Ich bin vergnugt
| data-sort-value="1815-01-01" | 1815 or1816?
| data-sort-value="Text by Claudius, Matthias, Ich bin vergnugt 1" | Text by Claudius
|-
| 363
| 363
| data-sort-value="ZZZZ" |
| data-sort-value="ZZZZ" |
| data-sort-value="410,00" | IV, 10
| An Chloen, D 363
| data-sort-value="text Die Munterkeit ist meinen Wangen" | Die Munterkeit ist meinen Wangen
| data-sort-value="1816-01-01" | 1816
| data-sort-value="Text by Uz, Johann, Die Munterkeit ist meinen Wangen" | Text by Uz; Fragment
|-
| 364
| 364
| data-sort-value="XXX,1897" | (1897)
| data-sort-value="2104,035" | XXI, 4No. 35
| data-sort-value="304,34" | III, 4No. 34
| Fischerlied, D 364
| data-sort-value="text Das Fischergewerbe gibt rustigen Mut 2" | Das Fischergewerbe gibt rüstigen Mut
| data-sort-value="1816-01-01" | 1816 or1817?
| data-sort-value="Text by Salis-Seewis, Johann Gaudenz von, Das Fischergewerbe gibt rustigen Mut 2" | Text by Salis-Seewis (other settings:  and 562); For ttbb
|-
| 365
| 365
| data-sort-value="009,1821.1" | 9(1821)
| data-sort-value="1200,001" | XIINo. 1
| data-sort-value="726,7a" | VII/2, 6& 7a
| data-sort-value="Original Dances, 36" | 36 Original Dances a.k.a. Erste Walzer
| data-sort-value="key I" | Various keys
| data-sort-value="1821-07-01" | 
| For piano; No. 2 publ. in 1826 as Beethoven's (Kinksky Anh. 14 No. 1)
|-
| 366
| 366
| data-sort-value="XXX,1824" | (1824)(1869)
| data-sort-value="1200,010" | XIINo. 10
| data-sort-value="726,7a" | VII/2, 6& 7a
| data-sort-value="Landler, 17, D 366" | 17 Ländler, D 366
| data-sort-value="key I" | Various keys
| data-sort-value="1824-11-01" | 
|-
| 367
| 367
| data-sort-value="005,1821-5" | 5,5(1821)
| data-sort-value="2004,261" | XX, 4No. 261
| data-sort-value="401,0055" | IV, 1a
| data-sort-value="Konig in Thule, Der" | Der König in Thule
| data-sort-value="text Es war ein Konig in Thule" | Es war ein König in Thule
| data-sort-value="1816-01-01" | early 1816
| data-sort-value="Text by Goethe, Johann Wolfgang von from Faust I, 8, Es war ein Konig in Thule" | Text by Goethe, from Faust I, 8
|-
| 368
| 368
| data-sort-value="003,1821-4" | 3,4(1821)
| data-sort-value="2004,262" | XX, 4No. 262
| data-sort-value="401,0034" | IV, 1a
| data-sort-value="Jagers Abendlied, D 368" | Jägers Abendlied, D 368
| data-sort-value="text Im Felde schleich ich, still und wild 2" | Im Felde schleich ich, still und wild
| data-sort-value="1816-01-01" | early 1816?
| data-sort-value="Text by Goethe, Johann Wolfgang von, Im Felde schleich ich, still und wild 2" | Text by Goethe
|-
| 369
| 369
| data-sort-value="019,1825-1" | 19,1(1825)
| data-sort-value="2004,263" | XX, 4No. 263
| data-sort-value="401,0191" | IV, 1a
| An Schwager Kronos
| data-sort-value="text Spute dich, Kronos!" | Spute dich, Kronos!
| data-sort-value="1816-01-01" | 1816
| data-sort-value="Text by Goethe, Johann Wolfgang von, Spute dich, Kronos!" | Text by Goethe
|-
| 370
| 370
| data-sort-value="XXX,1930" | (1930)
| data-sort-value="ZZZZ" |
| data-sort-value="609,00" | VI, 9
| data-sort-value="Landler, 09, D 370" | Nine Ländler, D 370
| data-sort-value="key D major" | D major
| data-sort-value="1816-01-01" | January1816
| For violin?; No. 7 reused in  No. 6
|-
| data-sort-value="371" | 371292
| 371
| data-sort-value="XXX,1872" | (1872)
| data-sort-value="2004,185" | XX, 4No. 185
| data-sort-value="410,00" | IV, 10
| Klage, D 371
| data-sort-value="text Trauer umfliesst mein Leben" | Trauer umfließt mein Leben
| data-sort-value="1816-01-01" | January1816
| Two versions: 1st, a sketch, was 
|-
| 372
| 372
| data-sort-value="XXX,1895" | (1895)
| data-sort-value="2004,183" | XX, 4No. 183
| data-sort-value="410,00" | IV, 10
| An die Natur
| data-sort-value="text Susse, heilige Natur" | Süße, heilige Natur
| data-sort-value="1816-01-15" | 15/1/1816
| data-sort-value="Text by Stolberg-Stolberg, Friedrich Leopold zu, Susse, heilige Natur" | Text by Stolberg-Stolberg
|-
| 373
| 373
| data-sort-value="XXX,1895" | (1895)
| data-sort-value="2004,184" | XX, 4No. 184
| data-sort-value="410,00" | IV, 10
| Lied, D 373
| data-sort-value="text Mutter geht durch ihre Kammern" | Mutter geht durch ihre Kammern
| data-sort-value="1816-01-15" | 15/1/1816?
| data-sort-value="Text by Motte Fouque, Friedrich de la, Mutter geht durch ihre Kammern" | Text by Motte Fouqué, from Undine
|-
| 374
| 374
| data-sort-value="XXX,1902" | (1902)
| data-sort-value="ZZZZ" |
| data-sort-value="609,00" | VI, 9
| data-sort-value="Landler, 11, D 374" | 11 Ländler, D 374
| data-sort-value="key B-flat major" | B major
| data-sort-value="1816-02-01" | February1816?
|-
| 375
| 375
| data-sort-value="XXX,1830" | (1830)
| data-sort-value="2004,187" | XX, 4No. 187
| data-sort-value="410,00" | IV, 10
| data-sort-value="Tod Oskars, Der" | Der Tod Oskars
| data-sort-value="text Warum offnest du wieder" | Warum öffnest du wieder
| data-sort-value="1816-02-01" | February1816
| data-sort-value="Text by Macpherson, James (Ossian), Warum offnest du wieder" | Text by Macpherson (Ossian), transl. by E. Baron de Harold
|-
| 376
| 376
| data-sort-value="XXX,1895" | (1895)
| data-sort-value="2010,592" | XX, 10No. 592
| data-sort-value="410,00" | IV, 10
| Lorma,  D 376
| data-sort-value="text Lorma sass in der Halle von Aldo 2" | Lorma saß in der Halle von Aldo
| data-sort-value="1816-02-10" | 10/2/1816
| data-sort-value="Text by Macpherson, James (Ossian) from The Battle of Lora, Lorma sass in der Halle von Aldo 2" | Text by Macpherson (Ossian), from The Battle of Lora, transl. by E. Baron de Harold; Fragment
|-
| 377
| 377
| data-sort-value="XXX,1872" | (1872)
| data-sort-value="2004,186" | XX, 4No. 186
| data-sort-value="303,21" | III, 3 No. 21Anh. I No. 3
| data-sort-value="Grab, Das, D 377" | Das Grab, D 377
| data-sort-value="text Das Grab ist tief und stille 3" | Das Grab ist tief und stille
| data-sort-value="1816-02-11" | 11/2/1816
| data-sort-value="Text by Salis-Seewis, Johann Gaudenz von, Das Grab ist tief und stille 3" | Text by Salis-Seewis (other settings: , 330, 569 and 643A); For TTBB and piano
|-
| 378
| 378
| data-sort-value="XXX,1889" | (1889)
| data-sort-value="1200,012" | XIINo. 12
| data-sort-value="726,00" | VII/2, 6
| data-sort-value="Landler, 08, D 378" | Eight Ländler, D 378
| data-sort-value="key B-flat major" | B major
| data-sort-value="1816-02-13" | 13/2/1816
| For piano; Nos. 1–5 and 7 reuse  Nos. 1–3, 7, 11 and 5; No. 2 partly in  No. 10; No. 6 reuses  No. 7
|-
| 379
| 379
| data-sort-value="XXX,1859" | (1859)
| data-sort-value="1400,017" | XIV No. 17
| data-sort-value="109,013" | I, 9No. 13& Anh. 2
| Deutsches Salve Regina (German Salve Regina)
| data-sort-value="text Sei, Mutter der Barmherzigkeit" | Sei, Mutter der BarmherzigkeitF major
| data-sort-value="1816-02-21" | 21/2/1816
| Text: after Salve Regina; For SATB and organ
|-
| 380
| 380
| data-sort-value="XXX,1897" | (1897)(1956)(1989)
| data-sort-value="2102,028" | XXI, 2No. 28
| data-sort-value="726,00" | VII/2, 6
| data-sort-value="Minuets, 03, D 380" | Three Minuets, each with Two Trios
| data-sort-value="key E major A major C major" |E major (No. 1)A major (No. 2)C major (No. 3)
| data-sort-value="1816-02-22" | 22/2/1816
| For piano; AGA only Nos. 1–2; Start of No. 3, a fragment (1st trio incomplete, 2nd trio missing), reused in 
|-
| 381
| 381
| data-sort-value="XXX,1895" | (1895)
| data-sort-value="2004,189" | XX, 4No. 189
| data-sort-value="410,00" | IV, 10
| Morgenlied, D 381
| data-sort-value="text Die frohe, neubelebte Flur" | Die frohe, neubelebte Flur
| data-sort-value="1816-02-24" | 24/2/1816
| data-sort-value="ZZZZ" |
|-
| 382
| 382
| data-sort-value="XXX,1895" | (1895)
| data-sort-value="2004,190" | XX, 4No. 190
| data-sort-value="410,00" | IV, 10
| Abendlied, D 382
| data-sort-value="text Sanft glanzt die Abendsonne" | Sanft glänzt die Abendsonne
| data-sort-value="1816-02-24" | 24/2/1816
| data-sort-value="ZZZZ" |
|-
| data-sort-value="383" | 383992
| 383
| data-sort-value="XXX,1888" | (1888)
| data-sort-value="1400,013" | XIV No. 13
| data-sort-value="107,00" | I, 7
| Stabat Mater, D 383, a.k.a. Deutsches Stabat Mater (German Stabat Mater)
| data-sort-value="text Jesus Christus schwebt am Kreuze" | Jesus Christus schwebt am KreuzeF minor
| data-sort-value="1816-02-28" | started28/2/1816
| data-sort-value="Text by Klopstock, Friedrich Gottlieb, Jesus Christus schwebt am Kreuze" | Text by Klopstock after Stabat Mater; For stbSATB and orchestra; Sketch for Nos. 5–6 was 
|-
| 384
| 384
| data-sort-value="137,1836-1" | 137p,1(1836)
| data-sort-value="0800,002" | VIIINo. 2
| data-sort-value="608,01" | VI, 8 No. 1& anh. 1
| Violin Sonata, D 384, a.k.a. Sonatina No. 1
| data-sort-value="key D major" | D major
| data-sort-value="1816-03-01" | March 1816
| Allegro molto (+early version in NSA) – Andante – Allegro vivace
|-
| 385
| 385
| data-sort-value="137,1836-2" | 137p,2(1836)
| data-sort-value="0800,003" | VIIINo. 3
| data-sort-value="608,02" | VI, 8 No. 2
| Violin Sonata, D 385, a.k.a. Sonatina No. 2
| data-sort-value="key A minor" | A minor
| data-sort-value="1816-03-01" | March 1816
| Allegro moderato – Andante – Minuet – Allegro
|-
| 386
| 386
| data-sort-value="XXX,1833" | (1833)
| data-sort-value="1400,020" | XIV No. 20
| data-sort-value="109,012" | I, 9No. 12& Anh. 1
| Salve Regina, D 386
| data-sort-value="key B-flat major" | B majorSalve Regina
| data-sort-value="1816-01-01" | early 1816
| data-sort-value="Text: Salve Regina 4" | Text: Salve Regina (other settings: , 106, 223, 676 and 811); For SATB
|-
| 387
| 387
| data-sort-value="XXX,1897" | (1897)
| data-sort-value="2104,044" | XXI, 4No. 44
| data-sort-value="302,94" | III, 2bAnh. No. 4b
| data-sort-value="Schlacht, Die, D 387" | Die Schlacht, D 387
| data-sort-value="text Schwer und dumpfig 2" | Schwer und dumpfig
| data-sort-value="1816-03-01" | March 1816
|-
| 388
| 388
| data-sort-value="XXX,1895" | (1895)
| data-sort-value="2004,193" | XX, 4No. 193
| data-sort-value="410,00" | IV, 10
| Laura am Klavier
| data-sort-value="text Wenn dein Finger durch die Saiten meistert" | Wenn dein Finger durch die Saiten meistert
| data-sort-value="1816-03-01" | March 1816
| data-sort-value="Text by Schiller, Friedrich, Wenn dein Finger durch die Saiten meistert" | Text by Schiller; Two versions
|-
| 389
| 389
| data-sort-value="XXX,1873" | (1873)
| data-sort-value="2004,194" | XX, 4No. 194
| data-sort-value="403,00" | IV, 3
| data-sort-value="Madchens Klage, Des, D 389" | Des Mädchens Klage, D 389
| data-sort-value="text Der Eichwald brauset 3" | Der Eichwald brauset
| data-sort-value="1816-03-01" | March 1816
| data-sort-value="Text by Schiller, Friedrich from Wallenstein: Die Piccolomini III, 7 Der Eichwald brauset 3" | Text by Schiller, from Wallenstein: Die Piccolomini III, 7 (other settings:  and 191)
|-
| 390
| 390
| data-sort-value="XXX,1895" | (1895)
| data-sort-value="2004,195" | XX, 4No. 195
| data-sort-value="410,00" | IV, 10
| data-sort-value="Entzuckung an Laura, D 390" | Entzückung an Laura, D 390
| data-sort-value="text Laura, uber diese Welt 1" | Laura, über diese Welt
| data-sort-value="1816-03-01" | March 1816
| data-sort-value="Text by Schiller, Friedrich, Laura, uber diese Welt 1" | Text by Schiller
|-
| 391
| 391
| data-sort-value="111,1829-3" | 111p,3(1829)
| data-sort-value="2004,196" | XX, 4No. 196
| data-sort-value="410,00" | IV, 10
| data-sort-value="Vier Weltalter, Die" | Die vier Weltalter
| data-sort-value="text Wohl perlet im Glase" | Wohl perlet im Glase
| data-sort-value="1816-03-01" | March 1816
| data-sort-value="Text by Schiller, Friedrich, Wohl perlet im Glase" | Text by Schiller
|-
| 392
| 392
| data-sort-value="XXX,1895" | (1895)
| data-sort-value="2004,197" | XX, 4No. 197
| data-sort-value="410,00" | IV, 10
| data-sort-value="Pflugerlied" | Pflügerlied
| data-sort-value="text Arbeitsam und wacker" | Arbeitsam und wacker
| data-sort-value="1816-03-01" | March 1816
| data-sort-value="Text by Salis-Seewis, Johann Gaudenz von, Arbeitsam und wacker" | Text by Salis-Seewis
|-
| 393
| 393
| data-sort-value="XXX,1845" | (1845)
| data-sort-value="2004,198" | XX, 4No. 198
| data-sort-value="411,00" | IV, 11
| data-sort-value="Einsiedelei, Die, D 393" | Die Einsiedelei, D 393
| data-sort-value="text Es rieselt klar und wehend ein Quell 2" | Es rieselt klar und wehend ein Quell
| data-sort-value="1816-03-01" | March 1816
| data-sort-value="Text by Salis-Seewis, Johann Gaudenz von, Es rieselt klar und wehend ein Quell 2" | Text by Salis-Seewis (other settings:  and 563)
|-
| 394
| 394
| data-sort-value="XXX,1895" | (1895)
| data-sort-value="2004,199" | XX, 4No. 199
| data-sort-value="410,00" | IV, 10
| An die Harmonie a.k.a. Gesang an die Harmonie
| data-sort-value="text Schopferin beseelter Tone!" | Schöpferin beseelter Töne!
| data-sort-value="1816-03-01" | March 1816
| data-sort-value="Text by Salis-Seewis, Johann Gaudenz von, Schopferin beseelter Tone!" | Text by Salis-Seewis
|-
| 395
| 395
| data-sort-value="111,1829-2" | 111p,2(1829)
| data-sort-value="2004,205" | XX, 4No. 205
| data-sort-value="410,00" | IV, 10
| Lebensmelodien
| data-sort-value="text Auf den Wassern wohnt mein stilles Leben" | Auf den Wassern wohnt mein stilles Leben
| data-sort-value="1816-03-01" | March 1816
| data-sort-value="Text by Schlegel, August Wilhelm, Auf den Wassern wohnt mein stilles Leben" | Text by Schlegel, A. W.
|-
| 396
| 396
| data-sort-value="XXX,1975" | (1975)
| data-sort-value="ZZZZ" |
| data-sort-value="402,2001" | IV, 2Anh. No. 1
| Gruppe aus dem Tartarus, D 396
| data-sort-value="text Horch, wie Murmeln des emporten Meeres 1" | Horch, wie Murmeln des empörten Meeres
| data-sort-value="1816-03-01" | March 1816
| data-sort-value="Text by Schiller, Friedrich from Gruppe aus dem Tartarus 00 1" | Text by Schiller (other settings:  and 583); Fragment
|-
| 397
| 397
| data-sort-value="XXX,1832" | (1832)
| data-sort-value="2004,191" | XX, 4No. 191
| data-sort-value="410,00" | IV, 10
| Ritter Toggenburg
| data-sort-value="text Ritter, treue Schwesterliebe" | Ritter, treue Schwesterliebe
| data-sort-value="1816-03-13" | 13/3/1816
| data-sort-value="Text by Schiller, Friedrich, Ritter, treue Schwesterliebe" | Text by Schiller
|-
| 398
| 398
| data-sort-value="XXX,1887" | (1887)
| data-sort-value="2004,217" | XX, 4No. 217
| data-sort-value="410,00" | IV, 10
| data-sort-value="Fruhlingslied, D 398" | Frühlingslied, D 398
| data-sort-value="text Die Luft ist blau 2" | Die Luft ist blau
| data-sort-value="1816-05-13" | 13/5/1816
| data-sort-value="Text by Holty, Ludwig Heinrich Christoph, Die Luft ist blau 2" | Text by Hölty
|-
| 399
| 399
| data-sort-value="XXX,1895" | (1895)
| data-sort-value="2004,218" | XX, 4No. 218
| data-sort-value="410,00" | IV, 10
| Auf den Tod einer Nachtigall, D 399
| data-sort-value="text Sie ist dahin, die Maienlieder tonte 2" | Sie ist dahin, die Maienlieder tönte
| data-sort-value="1816-05-13" | 13/5/1816
| data-sort-value="Text by Holty, Ludwig Heinrich Christoph, Sie ist dahin, die Maienlieder tonte 2" | Text by Hölty
|-
| 400
| 400
| data-sort-value="XXX,1895" | (1895)
| data-sort-value="2004,219" | XX, 4No. 219
| data-sort-value="410,00" | IV, 10
| data-sort-value="Knabenzeit, Die" | Die Knabenzeit
| data-sort-value="text Wie glucklich, wem das Knabenkleid" | Wie glücklich, wem das Knabenkleid
| data-sort-value="1816-05-13" | 13/5/1816
| data-sort-value="Text by Holty, Ludwig Heinrich Christoph, Wie glucklich, wem das Knabenkleid" | Text by Hölty
|-
| 401
| 401
| data-sort-value="XXX,1895" | (1895)
| data-sort-value="2004,220" | XX, 4No. 220
| data-sort-value="410,00" | IV, 10
| Winterlied, D 401
| data-sort-value="text Keine Blumen bluhn" | Keine Blumen blühn
| data-sort-value="1816-05-13" | 13/5/1816
| data-sort-value="Text by Holty, Ludwig Heinrich Christoph, Keine Blumen bluhn" | Text by Hölty
|-
| 402
| 402
| data-sort-value="XXX,1872" | (1872)
| data-sort-value="2004,192" | XX, 4No. 192
| data-sort-value="410,00" | IV, 10
| data-sort-value="Fluchtling, Der" | Der Flüchtling
| data-sort-value="text Frisch atmet des Morgens lebendiger Hauch 2" | Frisch atmet des Morgens lebendiger Hauch
| data-sort-value="1816-03-18" | 18/3/1816
| data-sort-value="Text by Schiller, Friedrich, Frisch atmet des Morgens lebendiger Hauch 2" | Text by Schiller
|-
| 403
| 403
| data-sort-value="XXX,1845" | (1845)(1895)
| data-sort-value="2004,201" | XX, 4No. 201
| data-sort-value="410,00" | IV, 10
| Lied, D 403
| data-sort-value="text In's stille Land" | In's stille Land
| data-sort-value="1816-03-27" | 27/3/1816
| data-sort-value="Text by Salis-Seewis, Johann Gaudenz von, In's stille Land" | Text by Salis-Seewis; Four versions: 1st, publ. in 1845, and 2nd in AGA; Music partly reappears in  No. 4
|-
| 404
| 404
| data-sort-value="XXX,1885" | (1885)
| data-sort-value="2004,200" | XX, 4No. 200
| data-sort-value="410,00" | IV, 10
| data-sort-value="Herbstnacht, Die" | Die Herbstnacht a.k.a. Die Wehmuth
| data-sort-value="text Mit leisen Harfentonen" | Mit leisen Harfentönen
| data-sort-value="1816-03-01" | March 1816
| data-sort-value="Text by Salis-Seewis, Johann Gaudenz von, Mit leisen Harfentonen" | Text by Salis-Seewis
|-
| 405
| 405
| data-sort-value="XXX,1895" | (1895)
| data-sort-value="2004,202" | XX, 4No. 202
| data-sort-value="410,00" | IV, 10
| data-sort-value="Herbstabend, Der" | Der Herbstabend
| data-sort-value="text Abendglockenhalle zittern" | Abendglockenhalle zittern
| data-sort-value="1816-04-01" | April 1816
| data-sort-value="Text by Salis-Seewis, Johann Gaudenz von, Abendglockenhalle zittern" | Text by Salis-Seewis; Two versions: 1st in AGA
|-
| 406
| 406
| data-sort-value="XXX,1887" | (1887)
| data-sort-value="2004,208" | XX, 4No. 208
| data-sort-value="410,00" | IV, 10
| Abschied von der Harfe
| data-sort-value="text Noch einmal ton, o Harfe" | Noch einmal tön, o Harfe
| data-sort-value="1816-03-01" | March 1816
| data-sort-value="Text by Salis-Seewis, Johann Gaudenz von, Noch einmal ton, o Harfe" | Text by Salis-Seewis
|-
| data-sort-value="407" | 407441
| 407
| data-sort-value="XXX,1891" | (1891)(1892)
| data-sort-value="1600,044" | XVINo. 44XIXNo. 5
| data-sort-value="303,22" | III, 3 No. 22Anh. IV No. 3VIII, 2No. 31
| data-sort-value="Beitrag zur funfzigjahrigen Jubelfeier des Herrn von Salieri" | Beitrag zur fünfzigjährigen Jubelfeier des Herrn von Salieri
| data-sort-value="text Gutigster, Bester! Weisester Grosster!" | Gütigster, Bester! Weisester Größter! – So Güt’ als Weisheit strömen mild – Unser aller Großpapa, bleibe noch recht lange da
| data-sort-value="1816-06-15" | before16/6/1816
| data-sort-value="Text by Schubert, Franz, Gutigster, Bester! Weisester Grosster!" | Text by Schubert; Quartet for ttbb (variant for ttb and piano: formerly ) – Aria for t and piano – Canon for three voices
|-
| 408
| 408
| data-sort-value="137,1836-3" | 137p,3(1836)
| data-sort-value="0800,004" | VIIINo. 4
| data-sort-value="608,03" | VI, 8 No. 3
| Violin Sonata, D 408, a.k.a. Sonatina No. 3
| data-sort-value="key G minor" | G minor
| data-sort-value="1816-04-01" | April 1816
| Allegro giusto – Andante – Minuet – Allegro moderato
|-
| 409
| 409
| data-sort-value="XXX,1872" | (1872)
| data-sort-value="2004,206" | XX, 4No. 206
| data-sort-value="410,00" | IV, 10
| data-sort-value="Verfehlte Stunde, Die" | Die verfehlte Stunde
| data-sort-value="text Qualend ungestilltes Sehnen" | Quälend ungestilltes Sehnen
| data-sort-value="1816-04-01" | April 1816
| data-sort-value="Text by Schlegel, August Wilhelm, Qualend ungestilltes Sehnen" | Text by Schlegel, A. W.
|-
| 410
| 410
| data-sort-value="115,1829-3" | 115p,3(1829)
| data-sort-value="2004,207" | XX, 4No. 207
| data-sort-value="410,00" | IV, 10
| Sprache der Liebe
| data-sort-value="text Lass dich mit gelinden Schlagen ruhren" | Laß dich mit gelinden Schlägen rühren
| data-sort-value="1816-04-01" | April 1816
| data-sort-value="Text by Schlegel, August Wilhelm, Lass dich mit gelinden Schlagen ruhren" | Text by Schlegel, A. W.
|-
| 411
| 411
| data-sort-value="XXX,1887" | (1887)
| data-sort-value="2004,209" | XX, 4No. 209
| data-sort-value="410,00" | IV, 10
| Daphne am Bach
| data-sort-value="text Ich hab' ein Bachlein funden" | Ich hab' ein Bächlein funden
| data-sort-value="1816-04-01" | April 1816
| data-sort-value="Text by Stolberg-Stolberg, Friedrich Leopold zu, Ich hab' ein Bachlein funden" | Text by Stolberg-Stolberg
|-
| 412
| 412
| data-sort-value="XXX,1838" | (1838)
| data-sort-value="2004,210" | XX, 4No. 210
| data-sort-value="410,00" | IV, 10
| Stimme der Liebe, D 412
| data-sort-value="text Meine Selinde" | Meine Selinde
| data-sort-value="1816-04-01" | April 1816
| data-sort-value="Text by Stolberg-Stolberg, Friedrich Leopold zu, Meine Selinde" | Text by Stolberg-Stolberg; Two versions: 2nd in AGA
|-
| 413
| 413
| data-sort-value="XXX,1895" | (1895)
| data-sort-value="2004,211" | XX, 4No. 211
| data-sort-value="410,00" | IV, 10
| data-sort-value="Entzuckung" | Entzückung
| data-sort-value="text Tag voll Himmel!" | Tag voll Himmel!
| data-sort-value="1816-04-01" | April 1816
| data-sort-value="Text by Matthisson, Friedrich von, Tag voll Himmel!" | Text by Matthisson
|-
| 414
| 414
| data-sort-value="XXX,1895" | (1895)
| data-sort-value="2004,212" | XX, 4No. 212
| data-sort-value="410,00" | IV, 10
| Geist der Liebe, D 414
| data-sort-value="text Der Abend schleiert Flur und Hain 1" | Der Abend schleiert Flur und Hain
| data-sort-value="1816-04-01" | April 1816
| data-sort-value="Text by Matthisson, Friedrich von, Der Abend schleiert Flur und Hain 1" | Text by Matthisson
|-
| 415
| 415
| data-sort-value="XXX,1895" | (1895)
| data-sort-value="2004,213" | XX, 4No. 213
| data-sort-value="410,00" | IV, 10
| Klage, D 415
| data-sort-value="text Die Sonne steigt, die Sonne sinkt" | Die Sonne steigt, die Sonne sinkt
| data-sort-value="1816-04-01" | April 1816
| data-sort-value="Text by Matthisson, Friedrich von, Die Sonne steigt, die Sonne sinkt" | Text by Matthisson
|-
| 416
| 416
| data-sort-value="XXX,1825" | (1825)
| data-sort-value="ZZZZ" |
| data-sort-value="410,00" | IV, 10
| Lied in der Abwesenheit
| data-sort-value="text Ach, mir ist das Herz so schwer" | Ach, mir ist das Herz so schwer
| data-sort-value="1816-04-01" | April 1816
| data-sort-value="Text by Stolberg-Stolberg, Friedrich Leopold zu, Ach, mir ist das Herz so schwer" | Text by Stolberg-Stolberg; Fragment
|-
| 417
| 417
| data-sort-value="XXX,1884" | (1884)
| data-sort-value="0102,004" | I, 2No. 4
| data-sort-value="502,04" | V, 2No. 4
| data-sort-value="Symphony No. 04" | Symphony No. 4Tragic
| data-sort-value="key C minor" | C minor
| data-sort-value="1816-04-27" | completed27/4/1816
| Adagio molto, Allegro vivace – Andante – Minuet – Allegro
|-
| 418
| 418
| data-sort-value="XXX,1895" | (1895)
| data-sort-value="2004,214" | XX, 4No. 214
| data-sort-value="410,00" | IV, 10
| Stimme der Liebe, D 418
| data-sort-value="text Abendgewolke schweben hell 2" | Abendgewölke schweben hell
| data-sort-value="1816-04-29" | 29/4/1816
| data-sort-value="Text by Matthisson, Friedrich von, Abendgewolke schweben hell 2" | Text by Matthisson
|-
| 419
| 419
| data-sort-value="XXX,1895" | (1895)
| data-sort-value="2004,215" | XX, 4No. 215
| data-sort-value="410,00" | IV, 10
| Julius an Theone
| data-sort-value="text Nimmer, nimmer darf ich dir gestehen" | Nimmer, nimmer darf ich dir gestehen
| data-sort-value="1816-04-30" | 30/4/1816
| data-sort-value="Text by Matthisson, Friedrich von, Nimmer, nimmer darf ich dir gestehen" | Text by Matthisson
|-
| 420
| 420
| data-sort-value="XXX,1871" | (1871)
| data-sort-value="1200,011a" | XIINo. 11
| data-sort-value="727,a0" | VII/2, 7a
| data-sort-value="German Dances, 12, D 420" | Twelve German Dances, D 420
| data-sort-value="key I" | Various keys
| data-sort-value="1816-01-01" | 1816
| For piano; No. 10 reappears in  No. 1
|-
| 421
| 421
| data-sort-value="XXX,1889" | (1889)
| data-sort-value="1200,027" | XIINo. 27
| data-sort-value="726,00" | VII/2, 6
| data-sort-value="Ecossaises, 06, D 421" | Six Écossaises, D 421
| data-sort-value="key I" | Various keys
| data-sort-value="1816-05-01" | May 1816
| For piano; No. 1 after  Écoss. No. 5
|-
| 422
| 422
| data-sort-value="016,1823-2" | 16,2(1823)
| data-sort-value="1600,008" | XVINo. 8
| data-sort-value="303,23" | III, 3 No. 23
| data-sort-value="Naturgenuss, D 422" | Naturgenuß, D 422
| data-sort-value="text Im Abendschimmer wallt der Quell 2" | Im Abendschimmer wallt der Quell
| data-sort-value="1822-01-01" | 1822?
| data-sort-value="Text by Matthisson, Friedrich von, Im Abendschimmer wallt der Quell 2" | Text by Matthisson; For ttbb and piano
|-
| 423
| 423
| data-sort-value="XXX,1974" | (1974)
| data-sort-value="ZZZZ" |
| data-sort-value="304,36" | III, 4No. 36
| data-sort-value="Andenken, D 423" | Andenken, D 423
| data-sort-value="text Ich denke dein wenn durch den Hain 2" | Ich denke dein wenn durch den Hain
| data-sort-value="1816-05-01" | May 1816
| data-sort-value="Text by Matthisson, Friedrich von, Ich denke dein wenn durch den Hain 2" | Text by Matthisson; For ttb
|-
| 424
| 424
| data-sort-value="XXX,1974" | (1974)
| data-sort-value="ZZZZ" |
| data-sort-value="304,37" | III, 4No. 37
| data-sort-value="Erinnerungen, D 424" | Erinnerungen, D 424
| data-sort-value="text Am Seegestad, in lauen Vollmondsnachten 2" | Am Seegestad, in lauen Vollmondsnächten
| data-sort-value="1816-05-01" | May 1816
| data-sort-value="Text by Matthisson, Friedrich von, Am Seegestad, in lauen Vollmondsnachten 2" | Text by Matthisson; For ttb
|-
| 425
| 425
| data-sort-value="ZZZZ" |
| data-sort-value="ZZZZ" |
| data-sort-value="ZZZZ" |
| Lebensbild
| data-sort-value="ZZZZ" |
| data-sort-value="1816-05-01" | May 1816
|-
| 426
| 426
| data-sort-value="ZZZZ" |
| data-sort-value="ZZZZ" |
| data-sort-value="304,00" | III, 4
| data-sort-value="Trinklied, D 426" | Trinklied, D 426
| data-sort-value="text Herr Bacchus ist ein braver Mann" | Herr Bacchus ist ein braver Mann
| data-sort-value="1816-05-01" | May 1816
| Lost; Text by Bürger; For ttb
|-
| 427
| 427
| data-sort-value="XXX,1892" | (1892)
| data-sort-value="1900,017" | XIXNo. 17
| data-sort-value="304,38" | III, 4No. 38
| Trinklied im Mai
| data-sort-value="text Bekranzet die Tonnen" | Bekränzet die Tonnen
| data-sort-value="1816-05-01" | May 1816
| data-sort-value="Text by Holty, Ludwig Heinrich Christoph, Bekranzet die Tonnen" | Text by Hölty; For ttb
|-
| 428
| 428
| data-sort-value="XXX,1974" | (1974)
| data-sort-value="ZZZZ" |
| data-sort-value="304,39" | III, 4No. 39
| Widerhall
| data-sort-value="text Auf ewig dein, wenn Berg und Meere trennen" | Auf ewig dein, wenn Berg und Meere trennen
| data-sort-value="1816-05-01" | May 1816
| data-sort-value="Text by Matthisson, Friedrich von, Auf ewig dein, wenn Berg und Meere trennen" | Text by Matthisson; For ttb
|-
| 429
| 429
| data-sort-value="XXX,1885" | (1885)
| data-sort-value="2004,221" | XX, 4No. 221
| data-sort-value="410,00" | IV, 10
| Minnelied
| data-sort-value="text Holder klingt der Vogelsang" | Holder klingt der Vogelsang
| data-sort-value="1816-05-01" | May 1816
| data-sort-value="Text by Holty, Ludwig Heinrich Christoph, Holder klingt der Vogelsang" | Text by Hölty
|-
| 430
| 430
| data-sort-value="XXX,1895" | (1895)
| data-sort-value="2004,222" | XX, 4No. 222
| data-sort-value="410,00" | IV, 10
| data-sort-value="Fruhe Liebe, Die" | Die frühe Liebe
| data-sort-value="text Schon im bunten Knabenkleide" | Schon im bunten Knabenkleide
| data-sort-value="1816-05-01" | May 1816
| data-sort-value="Text by Holty, Ludwig Heinrich Christoph, Schon im bunten Knabenkleide" | Text by Hölty; Two versions: 1st in AGA
|-
| 431
| 431
| data-sort-value="XXX,1887" | (1887)
| data-sort-value="2004,223" | XX, 4No. 223
| data-sort-value="410,00" | IV, 10
| Blumenlied
| data-sort-value="text Es ist ein halbes Himmelreich" | Es ist ein halbes Himmelreich
| data-sort-value="1816-05-01" | May 1816
| data-sort-value="Text by Holty, Ludwig Heinrich Christoph, Es ist ein halbes Himmelreich" | Text by Hölty
|-
| 432
| 432
| data-sort-value="XXX,1850" | (1850)(1895)
| data-sort-value="2004,224" | XX, 4No. 224
| data-sort-value="410,00" | IV, 10
| data-sort-value="Leidende, Der" | Der Leidende a.k.a. Klage, D 432
| data-sort-value="text Nimmer trag' ich langer" | Nimmer trag' ich langer
| data-sort-value="1816-05-01" | May 1816
| data-sort-value="Other setting Nimmer trag' ich langer 1" | Other setting: ; Two versions: 1st publ. in 1850
|-
| 433
| 433
| data-sort-value="XXX,1895" | (1895)
| data-sort-value="2004,225" | XX, 4No. 225
| data-sort-value="410,00" | IV, 10
| Seligkeit
| data-sort-value="text Freuden sonder Zahl" | Freuden sonder Zahl
| data-sort-value="1816-05-01" | May 1816
| data-sort-value="Text by Holty, Ludwig Heinrich Christoph, Freuden sonder Zahl" | Text by Hölty
|-
| 434
| 434
| data-sort-value="XXX,1850" | (1850)
| data-sort-value="2004,226" | XX, 4No. 226
| data-sort-value="410,00" | IV, 10
| Erntelied
| data-sort-value="text Sicheln schallen, Ahren fallen" | Sicheln schallen, Ähren fallen
| data-sort-value="1816-05-01" | May 1816
| data-sort-value="Text by Holty, Ludwig Heinrich Christoph, Sicheln schallen, Ahren fallen" | Text by Hölty
|-
| 435
| 435
| data-sort-value="XXX,1893" | (1893)
| data-sort-value="1507,013" | XV, 7No. 13
| data-sort-value="213,00" | II, 13III, 4 No. 30
| data-sort-value="Burgschaft, Die, D 435" | Die Bürgschaft, D 435
| data-sort-value="theatre (Opera in 3 acts)" | (Opera in three acts)
| data-sort-value="1816-05-02" | started2/5/1816
|-
| data-sort-value="436" | 436437
| 436
| data-sort-value="XXX,1850" | (1850)
| data-sort-value="2004,216" | XX, 4No. 216
| data-sort-value="410,00" | IV, 10
| Klage, D 436
| data-sort-value="text Dein Silber schien durch Eichengrun" | Dein Silber schien durch Eichengrün
| data-sort-value="1816-05-12" | 12/5/1816
| data-sort-value="Text by Holty, Ludwig Heinrich Christoph, Dein Silber schien durch Eichengrun" | Text by Hölty; Two versions: 1st publ. in 1850 – 2nd was D 437
|-
| 438
| 438
| data-sort-value="XXX,1897" | (1897)
| data-sort-value="2101,004" | XXI, 1No. 4
| data-sort-value="507,02" | V, 7 No. 2
| Rondo, D 438
| data-sort-value="key A major" | A major
| data-sort-value="1816-06-01" | June 1816
| For violin and string orchestra
|-
| 439
| 439
| data-sort-value="XXX,1872" | (1872)
| data-sort-value="1700,012" | XVIINo. 12
| data-sort-value="302,08" | III, 2aNo. 8
| An die Sonne, D 439
| data-sort-value="text O Sonne, Konigin der Welt" | O Sonne, Königin der Welt
| data-sort-value="1816-06-01" | June 1816
| data-sort-value="Text by Uz, Johann, O Sonne, Konigin der Welt" | Text by Uz; For satb and piano
|-
| 440
| 440
| data-sort-value="XXX,1839" | (1839)
| data-sort-value="1700,018" | XVIINo. 18
| data-sort-value="302,09" | III, 2aNo. 9
| Chor der Engel
| data-sort-value="text Christ ist erstanden" | Christ ist erstanden
| data-sort-value="1816-06-01" | June 1816
| data-sort-value="Text by Goethe, Johann Wolfgang von from Faust I, 01 Christ ist erstanden" | Text by Goethe, from Faust I, 1; For SATB
|-
| 441
| data-sort-value="999.0407" | 407
| data-sort-value="ZZZZ" |

| data-sort-value="ZZZZ" |

| data-sort-value="ZZZZ" |

| data-sort-value="ZZZZ" |

| data-sort-value="ZZZZ" |

| data-sort-value="ZZZZ" |

| See 
|-
| 442
| 442
| data-sort-value="XXX,1847" | (1847)
| data-sort-value="2004,227" | XX, 4No. 227
| data-sort-value="303,07" | III, 3 No. 7Anh. I No. 4IV, 10
| data-sort-value="Grosse Halleluja, Das" | Das große Halleluja
| data-sort-value="text Ehre sei dem Hocherhabnen" | Ehre sei dem Hocherhabnen
| data-sort-value="1816-06-01" | June 1816
| data-sort-value="Text by Klopstock, Friedrich Gottlieb, Ehre sei dem Hocherhabnen" | Text by Klopstock; For voice(s?) and piano
|-
| 443
| 443
| data-sort-value="XXX,1895" | (1895)
| data-sort-value="2004,228" | XX, 4No. 228
| data-sort-value="303,08" | III, 3 No. 8Anh. I No. 5IV, 10
| Schlachtlied, D 443, a.k.a. Schlachtgesang
| data-sort-value="text Mit unserm Arm ist nichts getan 1" | Mit unserm Arm ist nichts getan
| data-sort-value="1816-06-01" | June 1816
| data-sort-value="Text by Klopstock, Friedrich Gottlieb from Oden, Mit unserm Arm ist nichts getan 1" | Text by Klopstock, from Oden; For voice(s?) and piano
|-
| 444
| 444
| data-sort-value="XXX,1831" | (1831)
| data-sort-value="2004,229" | XX, 4No. 229
| data-sort-value="410,00" | IV, 10
| data-sort-value="Gestirne, Die" | Die Gestirne
| data-sort-value="text Es tonet sein Lob" | Es tönet sein Lob
| data-sort-value="1816-06-01" | June 1816
| data-sort-value="Text by Klopstock, Friedrich Gottlieb from Oden, Es tonet sein Lob" | Text by Klopstock, from Oden
|-
| 445
| 445
| data-sort-value="XXX,1837" | (1837)
| data-sort-value="2004,230" | XX, 4No. 230
| data-sort-value="410,00" | IV, 10
| Edone
| data-sort-value="text Dein susses Bild, Edone" | Dein süßes Bild, Edone
| data-sort-value="1816-06-01" | June 1816
| data-sort-value="Text by Klopstock, Friedrich Gottlieb from Oden, Dein susses Bild, Edone" | Text by Klopstock, from Oden
|-
| 446
| 446
| data-sort-value="XXX,1887" | (1887)
| data-sort-value="2004,231" | XX, 4No. 231
| data-sort-value="410,00" | IV, 10
| data-sort-value="Liebesgotter, Die" | Die Liebesgötter
| data-sort-value="text Cypris, meiner Phyllis gleich" | Cypris, meiner Phyllis gleich
| data-sort-value="1816-06-01" | June 1816
| data-sort-value="Text by Uz, Johann, Cypris, meiner Phyllis gleich" | Text by Uz
|-
| 447
| 447
| data-sort-value="XXX,1895" | (1895)
| data-sort-value="2004,232" | XX, 4No. 232
| data-sort-value="410,00" | IV, 10
| An den Schlaf
| data-sort-value="text Komm und senke die umflorten Schwingen" | Komm und senke die umflorten Schwingen
| data-sort-value="1816-06-01" | June 1816
| data-sort-value="ZZZZ" |
|-
| 448
| 448
| data-sort-value="XXX,1887" | (1887)
| data-sort-value="2004,233" | XX, 4No. 233
| data-sort-value="410,00" | IV, 10
| data-sort-value="Gott im Fruhlinge" | Gott im Frühlinge
| data-sort-value="text In seinem schimmernden Gewand" | In seinem schimmernden Gewand
| data-sort-value="1816-06-01" | June 1816
| data-sort-value="Text by Uz, Johann, In seinem schimmernden Gewand" | Text by Uz; Two versions: 1st, publ. in 1887, in AGA
|-
| 449
| 449
| data-sort-value="XXX,1872" | (1872)
| data-sort-value="2004,234" | XX, 4No. 234
| data-sort-value="410,00" | IV, 10
| data-sort-value="Gute Hirt, Der" | Der gute Hirt
| data-sort-value="text Was sorgest du?" | Was sorgest du?
| data-sort-value="1816-06-01" | June 1816
| data-sort-value="Text by Uz, Johann, Was sorgest du?" | Text by Uz
|-
| 450
| 450
| data-sort-value="XXX,1832" | (1832)(1895)
| data-sort-value="2004,236" | XX, 4No. 236
| data-sort-value="410,00" | IV, 10
| Fragment from Aeschylus
| data-sort-value="text So wird der Mann" | So wird der Mann
| data-sort-value="1816-06-01" | June 1816
| data-sort-value="Text by Mayrhofer, Johann after Aeschylus, So wird der Mann" | Text by Mayrhofer after Aeschylus' Eumenides (Oresteia III); Two versions: 2nd publ. in 1832
|-
| 451
| 451
| data-sort-value="ZZZZ" |
| data-sort-value="ZZZZ" |
| data-sort-value="ZZZZ" |
| Prometheus, D 451
| data-sort-value="text Hervor aus Buschen und Baumen" | Hervor aus Buschen und Baumen
| data-sort-value="1816-06-17" | 17/6/1816
|-
| data-sort-value="452" | 452961
| 452
| data-sort-value="048,1825-0" | 48(1825)(1829)
| data-sort-value="1301,004" | XIII, 1No. 4
| data-sort-value="102,02" | I, 2
| Mass No. 4
| data-sort-value="key C major" | C majorKyrie – Gloria – Credo – Sanctus & Benedictus – Agnus Dei
| data-sort-value="1828-10-01" | Jun. 1816–Oct. 1828
| data-sort-value="Text: Mass ordinary 10" | Text: Mass ordinary (other settings: , 31, 45, 49, 56, 66, 105, 167, 324, 678, 755 and 950); For satbSATB and orchestra; 2nd setting of "Benedictus", publ. in 1829, was 
|-
| 453
| 453
| data-sort-value="ZZZZ" |
| data-sort-value="ZZZZ" |
| data-sort-value="105,A2" | I, 5 Anh.
| Requiem
| data-sort-value="key C minor" | C minorIntroitus – Kyrie
| data-sort-value="1816-07-01" | July 1816
| Fragment; For SATB and orchestra
|-
| 454
| 454
| data-sort-value="XXX,1872" | (1872)
| data-sort-value="2004,239" | XX, 4No. 239
| data-sort-value="410,00" | IV, 10
| Grablied auf einen Soldaten
| data-sort-value="text Zieh hin, du braver Krieger du!" | Zieh hin, du braver Krieger du!
| data-sort-value="1816-07-01" | July 1816
| data-sort-value="Text by Schubart, Christian Friedrich Daniel, Zieh hin, du braver Krieger du!" | Text by Schubart
|-
| 455
| 455
| data-sort-value="XXX,1887" | (1887)
| data-sort-value="2004,240" | XX, 4No. 240
| data-sort-value="410,00" | IV, 10
| Freude der Kinderjahre
| data-sort-value="text Freude, die im fruhen Lenze" | Freude, die im frühen Lenze
| data-sort-value="1816-07-01" | July 1816
| data-sort-value="Text by Köpken, Friedrich von, Freude, die im fruhen Lenze" | Text by 
|-
| 456
| 456
| data-sort-value="XXX,1887" | (1887)
| data-sort-value="2004,241" | XX, 4No. 241
| data-sort-value="410,00" | IV, 10
| data-sort-value="Heimweh, Das, D 456" | Das Heimweh, D 456
| data-sort-value="text Oft in einsam stillen Stunden" | Oft in einsam stillen Stunden
| data-sort-value="1816-07-01" | July 1816
| data-sort-value="Text by Hell, Theodor, Oft in einsam stillen Stunden" | Text by Hell
|-
| 457
| 457
| data-sort-value="044,1827-0" | 44(1827)
| data-sort-value="2004,237" | XX, 4No. 237
| data-sort-value="403,00" | IV, 3
| An die untergehende Sonne
| data-sort-value="text Sonne, du sinkst" | Sonne, du sinkst
| data-sort-value="1817-05-01" | July 1816–May 1817
| data-sort-value="Text by Kosegarten, Ludwig Gotthard, Sonne, du sinkst" | Text by Kosegarten
|-
| 458
| 458
| data-sort-value="XXX,1872" | (1872)
| data-sort-value="2004,242" | XX, 4No. 242
| data-sort-value="410,00" | IV, 10
| Aus Diego Manazares: Ilmerine
| data-sort-value="text Wo irrst du durch einsame Schatten" | Wo irrst du durch einsame Schatten
| data-sort-value="1816-07-30" | 30/07/1816
|-
| data-sort-value="459.1" | 459(Nos.1–2)
| 459
| data-sort-value="XXX,1843" | (1843)
| data-sort-value="1100,014" | XI No. 14
| data-sort-value="721,03" | VII/2, 1No. 3
| Piano Sonata, D 459
| data-sort-value="key E major" | E major
| data-sort-value="1816-08-01" | August1816
| Allegro moderato – Scherzo; With  a.k.a. Fünf Klavierstücke
|-
| data-sort-value="459.3" | 459(Nos.3–5)
| 459A
| data-sort-value="XXX,1843" | (1843)
| data-sort-value="1100,014" | XI No. 14
| data-sort-value="724,00" | VII/2, 4
| data-sort-value="Piano pieces, 3, D 459A" | Three piano pieces, D 459A
| data-sort-value="key C major A major E major" | C major (No. 1)A major (No. 2)E major (No. 3)
| data-sort-value="1816-07-01" | 1816?
| Adagio – Scherzo – Allegro patetico; With  a.k.a. Fünf Klavierstücke
|-
| 460
| 460
| data-sort-value="XXX,1888" | (1888)
| data-sort-value="1400,007" | XIV No. 7
| data-sort-value="109,006" | I, 9No. 6
| Tantum ergo, D 460
| data-sort-value="key C major" | C major
| data-sort-value="1816-08-01" | August1816
| data-sort-value="Text by Aquinas, Thomas, Tantum ergo 1" | Text by Aquinas (other settings: , 730, 739, 750, 962 and Anh. I/17); For sSATB and orchestra
|-
| 461
| 461
| data-sort-value="XXX,1935" | (1935)
| data-sort-value="ZZZZ" |
| data-sort-value="109,007" | I, 9No. 7
| Tantum ergo, D 461
| data-sort-value="key C major" | C major
| data-sort-value="1816-08-01" | August1816
| data-sort-value="Text by Aquinas, Thomas, Tantum ergo 2" | Text by Aquinas (other settings: , 730, 739, 750, 962 and Anh. I/17); For satbSATB and orchestra
|-
| 462
| 462
| data-sort-value="XXX,1895" | (1895)
| data-sort-value="2004,244" | XX, 4No. 244
| data-sort-value="410,00" | IV, 10
| An Chloen, D 462
| data-sort-value="text Bei der Liebe reinsten Flammen" | Bei der Liebe reinsten Flammen
| data-sort-value="1816-08-01" | August1816
| data-sort-value="Text by Jacobi, Johann Georg, Bei der Liebe reinsten Flammen" | Text by Jacobi
|-
| 463
| 463
| data-sort-value="XXX,1895" | (1895)
| data-sort-value="2004,245" | XX, 4No. 245
| data-sort-value="410,00" | IV, 10
| Hochzeit-Lied
| data-sort-value="text Will singen euch im alten Ton" | Will singen euch im alten Ton
| data-sort-value="1816-08-01" | August1816
| data-sort-value="Text by Jacobi, Johann Georg, Will singen euch im alten Ton" | Text by Jacobi
|-
| 464
| 464
| data-sort-value="XXX,1895" | (1895)
| data-sort-value="2004,246" | XX, 4No. 246
| data-sort-value="410,00" | IV, 10
| In der Mitternacht
| data-sort-value="text Todesstille deckt das Tal" | Todesstille deckt das Tal
| data-sort-value="1816-08-01" | August1816
| data-sort-value="Text by Jacobi, Johann Georg, Todesstille deckt das Tal" | Text by Jacobi
|-
| 465
| 465
| data-sort-value="XXX,1885" | (1885)
| data-sort-value="2004,247" | XX, 4No. 247
| data-sort-value="410,00" | IV, 10
| Trauer der Liebe
| data-sort-value="text Wo die Taub' in stillen Buchen" | Wo die Taub' in stillen Buchen
| data-sort-value="1816-08-01" | August1816
| data-sort-value="Text by Jacobi, Johann Georg, Wo die Taub' in stillen Buchen" | Text by Jacobi; Two versions: 1st, in AGA, publ. 1885
|-
| 466
| 466
| data-sort-value="XXX,1872" | (1872)
| data-sort-value="2004,248" | XX, 4No. 248
| data-sort-value="410,00" | IV, 10
| data-sort-value="Perle, Die" | Die Perle
| data-sort-value="text Es ging ein Mann zur Fruhlingszeit" | Es ging ein Mann zur Frühlingszeit
| data-sort-value="1816-08-01" | August1816
| data-sort-value="Text by Jacobi, Johann Georg, Es ging ein Mann zur Fruhlingszeit" | Text by Jacobi
|-
| 467
| 467
| data-sort-value="XXX,1885" | (1885)
| data-sort-value="2010,593" | XX, 10No. 593
| data-sort-value="410,00" | IV, 10
| Pflicht und Liebe
| data-sort-value="text Du, der ewig um mich trauert" | Du, der ewig um mich trauert
| data-sort-value="1816-08-01" | August1816
| data-sort-value="Text by Gotter, Friedrich Wilhelm, Du, der ewig um mich trauert" | Text by Gotter; Fragment
|-
| 468
| 468
| data-sort-value="XXX,1895" | (1895)
| data-sort-value="2004,243" | XX, 4No. 243
| data-sort-value="410,00" | IV, 10
| An den Mond, D 468
| data-sort-value="text Was schauest du so hell" | Was schauest du so hell
| data-sort-value="1816-08-07" | 07/08/1816
| data-sort-value="Text by Holty, Ludwig Heinrich Christoph, Was schauest du so hell" | Text by Hölty
|-
| 469
| 469
| data-sort-value="XXX,1897" | (1897)
| data-sort-value="2211,056" | XXII, 11 Nos. 394–395
| data-sort-value="403,00" | IV, 3
| Mignon, D 469
| data-sort-value="text So lasst mich scheinen, bis ich werde 1" | So laßt mich scheinen, bis ich werde
| data-sort-value="1816-09-01" | September1816
| data-sort-value="Text by Goethe, Johann Wolfgang von from Wilhelm Meister's Apprenticeship, So lasst mich scheinen, bis ich werde 1" | Text by Goethe, from Wilhelm Meister's Apprenticeship (other settings:  and 877 No. 3); Two versions, both fragments
|-
| data-sort-value="470" | 470601
| 470
| data-sort-value="XXX,1886" | (1886)
| data-sort-value="0200,003" | II No. 3
| data-sort-value="505,04" | V, 5VI, 4 Anh. No. 4
| Overture, D 470
| data-sort-value="key B-flat major" | B major
| data-sort-value="1816-09-01" | September1816
| For orchestra; Overture to (?); Fragment for string quartet was 
|-
| 471
| 471
| data-sort-value="XXX,1890" | (1890)(1897)
| data-sort-value="0600,001" | VI No. 1XXII, 1 p. 84
| data-sort-value="606,01" | VI, 6 No. 1& Anh. No. 2
| String Trio, D 471
| data-sort-value="key B-flat major" | B major
| data-sort-value="1816-09-01" | September1816
| Allegro (AGA VI) – Andante sostenuto (fragment, in AGA XXII)
|-
| 472
| 472
| data-sort-value="128,1830-0" | 128p(1830)(1892)
| data-sort-value="1700,002" | XVIINo. 2
| data-sort-value="301,00" | III, 1
| Kantate zu Ehren von Josef Spendou
| data-sort-value="text Da liegt er, starr" | Da liegt er, starr – Gottes Bild ist Furst und Staat – Ein Punkt nur ist der Mensch – Die Sonne sticht
| data-sort-value="1816-09-01" | September1816
|-
| 473
| 473
| data-sort-value="XXX,1833" | (1833)(1895)
| data-sort-value="2004,249" | XX, 4No. 249
| data-sort-value="410,00" | IV, 10
| Liedesend
| data-sort-value="text Auf seinem gold'nen Throne" | Auf seinem gold'nen Throne
| data-sort-value="1816-09-01" | September1816
| data-sort-value="Text by Mayrhofer, Johann, Auf seinem gold'nen Throne" | Text by Mayrhofer; Two versions: 2nd in 1st ed.
|-
| 474
| 474
| data-sort-value="XXX,1832" | (1832)(1895)
| data-sort-value="2004,250" | XX, 4No. 250
| data-sort-value="410,00" | IV, 10
| Lied des Orpheus, als er in die Hölle ging
| data-sort-value="text Walze dich hinweg" | Wälze dich hinweg
| data-sort-value="1816-09-01" | September1816
| data-sort-value="Text by Jacobi, Johann Georg, Walze dich hinweg" | Text by Jacobi; Two versions: 2nd in 1st ed.
|-
| 475
| 475
| data-sort-value="XXX,1885" | (1885)
| data-sort-value="2004,251" | XX, 4No. 251
| data-sort-value="411,00" | IV, 11
| Abschied: Nach einer Wallfahrts-Arie bearbeitet
| data-sort-value="text Uber die Berge zieht ihr fort" | Über die Berge zieht ihr fort
| data-sort-value="1816-09-01" | September1816
| data-sort-value="Text by Jacobi, Johann Georg, Uber die Berge zieht ihr fort" | Text by Jacobi
|-
| 476
| 476
| data-sort-value="XXX,1872" | (1872)
| data-sort-value="2004,252" | XX, 4No. 252
| data-sort-value="411,00" | IV, 11
| data-sort-value="Ruckweg" | Rückweg
| data-sort-value="text Zum Donaustrom, zur Kaiserstadt" | Zum Donaustrom, zur Kaiserstadt
| data-sort-value="1816-09-01" | September1816
| data-sort-value="Text by Mayrhofer, Johann, Zum Donaustrom, zur Kaiserstadt" | Text by Mayrhofer
|-
| 477
| 477
| data-sort-value="XXX,1895" | (1895)
| data-sort-value="2004,253" | XX, 4No. 253
| data-sort-value="411,00" | IV, 11
| Alte Liebe rostet nie
| data-sort-value="text Alte Liebe rostet nie" | Alte Liebe rostet nie
| data-sort-value="1816-09-01" | September1816
| data-sort-value="Text by Mayrhofer, Johann, Alte Liebe rostet nie" | Text by Mayrhofer
|-
| data-sort-value="478" | 478479480
| 478
| data-sort-value="012,1822-0" | 12(1822)(1895)
| data-sort-value="2004,254" | XX, 4Nos. 254, 256–258, 255
| data-sort-value="401,0120" | IV, 1a &b No. 10& Anh.Nos. 6–7
| data-sort-value="Gesange des Harfners aus Wilhelm Meister" | Gesänge des Harfners aus "Wilhelm Meister"
| data-sort-value="text Wer sich der Einsamkeit ergibt 2" | 1. Wer sich der Einsamkeit ergibt – 2. Wer nie sein Brot mit Tränen aß – 3. An die Türen will ich schleichen
| data-sort-value="1822-01-01" | September1816–1822
| data-sort-value="Text by Goethe, Johann Wolfgang von from Wilhelm Meister's Apprenticeship, Wer sich der Einsamkeit ergibt 2" | Text by Goethe, from Wilhelm Meister's Apprenticeship (other setting of No. 1); No. 2 was D 480; No. 3 was D 479; Two versions: 1st, Harfenspieler I/III/II, composed 1816, publ. 1895, has two variants of No. 2 – 2nd, 1822, is Op. 12
|-
| 481
| 481
| data-sort-value="XXX,1895" | (1895)
| data-sort-value="2004,259" | XX, 4No. 259
| data-sort-value="403,00" | IV, 3
| data-sort-value="Sehnsucht, D 481" | Sehnsucht, D 481
| data-sort-value="text Nur wer die Sehnsucht kennt 3" | Nur wer die Sehnsucht kennt
| data-sort-value="1816-09-01" | September1816
| data-sort-value="Text by Goethe, Johann Wolfgang von from Wilhelm Meister's Apprenticeship, Nur wer die Sehnsucht kennt 3" | Text by Goethe, from Wilhelm Meister's Apprenticeship (other settings: , 359, 656 and 877 Nos. 1 & 4)
|-
| 482
| 482
| data-sort-value="XXX,1895" | (1895)
| data-sort-value="2004,264" | XX, 4No. 264
| data-sort-value="411,00" | IV, 11
| data-sort-value="Sanger am Felsen, Der" | Der Sänger am Felsen
| data-sort-value="text Klage, meine Flote, klage" | Klage, meine Flöte, klage
| data-sort-value="1816-09-01" | September1816
| data-sort-value="Text by Pichler, Karoline from Idyllen, Klage, meine Flote, klage" | Text by Pichler, from Idyllen
|-
| 483
| 483
| data-sort-value="XXX,1895" | (1895)
| data-sort-value="2004,265" | XX, 4No. 265
| data-sort-value="411,00" | IV, 11
| Lied, D 483
| data-sort-value="text Ferne von der grossen Stadt" | Ferne von der großen Stadt
| data-sort-value="1816-09-01" | September1816
| data-sort-value="Text by Pichler, Karoline from Idyllen, Ferne von der grossen Stadt" | Text by Pichler, from Idyllen
|-
| 484
| 484
| data-sort-value="XXX,1895" | (1895)
| data-sort-value="2010,594" | XX, 10No. 594
| data-sort-value="411,00" | IV, 11
| data-sort-value="Gesang der Geister uber den Wassern, D 484" | Gesang der Geister über den Wassern, D 484
| data-sort-value="text Des Menschen Seele gleicht dem Wasser 1" | Des Menschen Seele gleicht dem Wasser
| data-sort-value="1816-09-01" | September1816
| data-sort-value="Text by Goethe, Johann Wolfgang von, Des Menschen Seele gleicht dem Wasser 1" | Text by Goethe (other settings: , 705 and 714); Fragment
|-
| 485
| 485
| data-sort-value="XXX,1885" | (1885)
| data-sort-value="0102,005" | I, 2No. 5
| data-sort-value="502,05" | V, 2No. 5
| data-sort-value="Symphony No. 05" | Symphony No. 5
| data-sort-value="key B-flat major" | B major
| data-sort-value="1816-10-03" | Sept.–3 Oct.1816
| Allegro – Andante con moto – Minuet – Allegro vivace
|-
| 486
| 486
| data-sort-value="XXX,1888" | (1888)
| data-sort-value="1400,011" | XIV No. 11
| data-sort-value="109,004" | I, 9No. 4
| Magnificat
| data-sort-value="text Magnificat anima mea Dominum" | Magnificat anima mea DominumC major
| data-sort-value="1815-09-15" | 15/09/1815
| data-sort-value="Text by Luke, Magnificat anima mea Dominum" | Text by Luke (Vulgate translation); For satbSATB and orchestra
|-
| 487
| 487
| data-sort-value="XXX,1865" | (1865)
| data-sort-value="0701,002" | VII, 1No. 2
| data-sort-value="507,04" | V, 7 No. 4VI, 7 No. 5
| Adagio e Rondo concertante
| data-sort-value="key F major" | F major
| data-sort-value="1816-10-01" | October 1816
| For piano quartet
|-
| 488
| 488
| data-sort-value="XXX,1888" | (1888)
| data-sort-value="1400,010" | XIV No. 10
| data-sort-value="108,00" | I, 8
| Auguste jam coelestium
| data-sort-value="text Auguste jam coelestium" | Auguste jam coelestium
| data-sort-value="1816-10-01" | October 1816
| Duet for st and orchestra
|-
| data-sort-value="489" | 489493
| 489
| data-sort-value="004,1821-1" | 4,1(1821)(1895)(1970)
| data-sort-value="2004,266" | XX, 4No. 266
| data-sort-value="401,0041" | IV, 1a &b No. 5
| data-sort-value="Wanderer, Der, D 489" | Der Wanderer, D 489, a.k.a. Der Unglückliche
| data-sort-value="text Ich komme vom Gebirge her" | Ich komme vom Gebirge her
| data-sort-value="1816-10-01" | October 1816
|-
| 490
| 490
| data-sort-value="XXX,1895" | (1895)
| data-sort-value="2004,267" | XX, 4No. 267
| data-sort-value="411,00" | IV, 11
| data-sort-value="Hirt, Der" | Der Hirt
| data-sort-value="text Du Turm! zu meinem Leide" | Du Turm! zu meinem Leide
| data-sort-value="1816-10-01" | October 1816
| data-sort-value="Text by Mayrhofer, Johann, Du Turm! zu meinem Leide" | Text by Mayrhofer
|-
| 491
| 491
| data-sort-value="XXX,1887" | (1887)
| data-sort-value="2004,269" | XX, 4No. 269
| data-sort-value="411,00" | IV, 11
| Geheimnis: An F. Schubert
| data-sort-value="text Sag an, wer lehrt dich Lieder" | Sag an, wer lehrt dich Lieder
| data-sort-value="1816-10-01" | October 1816
| data-sort-value="Text by Mayrhofer, Johann, Sag an, wer lehrt dich Lieder" | Text by Mayrhofer
|-
| 492
| 492
| data-sort-value="XXX,1849" | (1849)
| data-sort-value="2004,270" | XX, 4No. 270
| data-sort-value="303,15" | III, 3 No. 15IV, 11
| Zum Punsche, D 492
| data-sort-value="text Woget brausend, Harmonien" | Woget brausend, Harmonien
| data-sort-value="1816-10-01" | October 1816
| data-sort-value="Text by Mayrhofer, Johann, Woget brausend, Harmonien" | Text by Mayrhofer
|-
| 493
| data-sort-value="999.0489" | 489
| data-sort-value="ZZZZ" |

| data-sort-value="ZZZZ" |

| data-sort-value="ZZZZ" |

| data-sort-value="ZZZZ" |

| data-sort-value="ZZZZ" |

| data-sort-value="ZZZZ" |

| See 
|-
| 494
| 494
| data-sort-value="XXX,1871" | (1871)
| data-sort-value="1600,032" | XVINo. 32
| data-sort-value="304,41" | III, 4No. 41
| data-sort-value="Geistertanz, Der, D 494" | Der Geistertanz, D 494
| data-sort-value="text Die bretterne Kammer der Toten erbebt 4" | Die bretterne Kammer der Toten erbebt
| data-sort-value="1816-11-01" | November 1816
| data-sort-value="Text by Matthisson, Friedrich von, Die bretterne Kammer der Toten erbebt 4" | Text by Matthisson (other settings: , 15A and 116); For ttbbb
|-
| 495
| 495
| data-sort-value="XXX,1868" | (1868)
| data-sort-value="2004,271" | XX, 4No. 271
| data-sort-value="411,00" | IV, 11
| data-sort-value="Abendlied der Furstin" | Abendlied der Fürstin
| data-sort-value="text Der Abend rotet nun das Tal" | Der Abend rötet nun das Tal
| data-sort-value="1816-11-01" | November 1816
| data-sort-value="Text by Mayrhofer, Johann, Der Abend rotet nun das Tal" | Text by Mayrhofer
|-
| 496
| 496
| data-sort-value="XXX,1885" | (1885)
| data-sort-value="2004,274" | XX, 4No. 274
| data-sort-value="411,00" | IV, 11
| Bei dem Grabe meines Vaters
| data-sort-value="text Friede sei um diesen Grabstein her!" | Friede sei um diesen Grabstein her!
| data-sort-value="1816-11-01" | November 1816
| data-sort-value="Text by Claudius, Matthias, Friede sei um diesen Grabstein her!" | Text by Claudius
|-
| 140
| 496A
| data-sort-value="XXX,1968" | (1968)
| data-sort-value="ZZZZ" |
| data-sort-value="407,22" | IV, 7No. 22
| Klage um Ali Bey, D 496A
| data-sort-value="text Lasst mich! lasst mich! ich will klagen 2" | Laßt mich! laßt mich! ich will klagen
| data-sort-value="1816-11-01" | November 1816
| data-sort-value="Text by Claudius, Matthias, Lasst mich! lasst mich! ich will klagen 2" | Text by Claudius
|-
| 497
| 497
| data-sort-value="098,1829-1" | 98,1(1829)
| data-sort-value="2004,276" | XX, 4No. 276
| data-sort-value="405,00" | IV, 5
| An die Nachtigall, D 497
| data-sort-value="text Er liegt und schlaft" | Er liegt und schläft
| data-sort-value="1816-11-01" | November 1816
| data-sort-value="Text by Claudius, Matthias, Er liegt und schlaft" | Text by Claudius
|-
| 498
| 498
| data-sort-value="098,1829-2" | 98,2(1829)
| data-sort-value="2004,277" | XX, 4No. 277
| data-sort-value="405,00" | IV, 5
| Wiegenlied, D 498
| data-sort-value="text Schlafe, schlafe, holder susser Knabe" | Schlafe, schlafe, holder süßer Knabe
| data-sort-value="1816-11-01" | November 1816
| data-sort-value="ZZZZ" |
|-
| 499
| 499
| data-sort-value="XXX,1885" | (1885)
| data-sort-value="2004,278" | XX, 4No. 278
| data-sort-value="411,00" | IV, 11
| Abendlied, D 499
| data-sort-value="text Der Mond ist aufgegangen" | Der Mond ist aufgegangen
| data-sort-value="1816-11-01" | November 1816
| data-sort-value="Text by Claudius, Matthias, Der Mond ist aufgegangen" | Text by Claudius
|- id="D 500"
| 500
| 500
| data-sort-value="XXX,1895" | (1895)
| data-sort-value="2004,279" | XX, 4No. 279
| data-sort-value="411,00" | IV, 11
| Phidile
| data-sort-value="text Ich war erst sechzehn Sommer alt" | Ich war erst sechzehn Sommer alt
| data-sort-value="1816-11-01" | November 1816
| data-sort-value="Text by Claudius, Matthias, Ich war erst sechzehn Sommer alt" | Text by Claudius
|- id="D 501"
| 501
| 501
| data-sort-value="XXX,1895" | (1895)
| data-sort-value="2004,281" | XX, 4No. 281
| data-sort-value="411,00" | IV, 11
| Zufriedenheit, D 501
| data-sort-value="text Ich bin vergnugt 2" | Ich bin vergnugt
| data-sort-value="1816-11-01" | November 1816
| data-sort-value="Text by Claudius, Matthias, Ich bin vergnugt 2" | Text by Claudius; Two versions: 1st in AGA
|-
| 502
| 502
| data-sort-value="XXX,1872" | (1872)
| data-sort-value="2004,282" | XX, 4No. 282
| data-sort-value="411,00" | IV, 11
| Herbstlied, D 502
| data-sort-value="text Bunt sind schon die Walder" | Bunt sind schon die Wälder
| data-sort-value="1816-11-01" | November 1816
| data-sort-value="Text by Salis-Seewis, Johann Gaudenz von, Bunt sind schon die Walder" | Text by Salis-Seewis
|-
| 503
| 503
| data-sort-value="ZZZZ" |
| data-sort-value="ZZZZ" |
| data-sort-value="411,00" | IV, 11
| Mailied, D 503
| data-sort-value="text Gruner wird die Au 3" | Grüner wird die Au
| data-sort-value="1816-11-01" | November 1816
| data-sort-value="Text by Holty, Ludwig Heinrich Christoph, Gruner wird die Au 3" | Text by Hölty (other settings:  and 199)
|-
| 504
| 504
| data-sort-value="006,1821-3" | 6,3(1821)(1970)
| data-sort-value="2004,275" | XX, 4No. 275
| data-sort-value="401,0063" | IV, 1a &b No. 8
| Am Grabe Anselmos
| data-sort-value="text Dass ich dich verloren habe" | Daß ich dich verloren habe
| data-sort-value="1816-11-04" | 4/11/1816
| data-sort-value="Text by Claudius, Matthias, Dass ich dich verloren habe" | Text by Claudius; Two versions: 1st, in AGA, is Op. 6 No. 3
|- id="D 505"
| 505
| 505
| data-sort-value="145,1848-1" | 145p,1(1848)(1897)
| data-sort-value="1100,005a" | XI No. 5XXII, 4 No. 5
| data-sort-value="722,09" | VII/2, 2
| Adagio, D 505
| data-sort-value="key D-flat major" | D major
| data-sort-value="1818-09-01" | September1818?
| For piano; 2nd movement of ?; Abridged variant in E major, in AGA XXI, is Op. posth. 145 No. 1
|-
| 506
| 506
| data-sort-value="145,1848-2" | 145p,2(1848)
| data-sort-value="1100,005b" | XI No. 5
| data-sort-value="724,00" | VII/2, 4
| Rondo, D 506
| data-sort-value="key E major" | E major
| data-sort-value="1817-06-01" | June 1817?
| For piano; 4th movement of ?
|-
| 507
| 507
| data-sort-value="XXX,1895" | (1895)
| data-sort-value="2004,283" | XX, 4No. 283
| data-sort-value="411,00" | IV, 11
| Skolie, D 507
| data-sort-value="text Madchen entsiegelten" | Mädchen entsiegelten
| data-sort-value="1816-12-01" | December 1816
| data-sort-value="Text by Matthisson, Friedrich von, Madchen entsiegelten" | Text by Matthisson
|-
| 508
| 508
| data-sort-value="XXX,1845" | (1845)
| data-sort-value="2004,284" | XX, 4No. 284
| data-sort-value="411,00" | IV, 11
| Lebenslied, D 508
| data-sort-value="text Kommen und Scheiden 1" | Kommen und Scheiden
| data-sort-value="1816-12-01" | December 1816
| data-sort-value="Text by Matthisson, Friedrich von, Kommen und Scheiden 1" | Text by Matthisson (other settings: , and possibly 425)
|-
| 509
| 509
| data-sort-value="XXX,1872" | (1872)
| data-sort-value="2004,285" | XX, 4No. 285
| data-sort-value="411,00" | IV, 11
| Leiden der Trennung
| data-sort-value="text Vom Meere trennt sich die Welle" | Vom Meere trennt sich die Welle
| data-sort-value="1816-12-01" | December 1816
| Text by Metastasio, from Artaserse III, 1, "L'onda dal mar divisa", transl. by Collin, H. J.; Two versions: 1st is a fragment – 2nd in AGA
|-
| 510
| 510
| data-sort-value="XXX,1895" | (1895)
| data-sort-value="2010,573" | XX, 10No. 573
| data-sort-value="411,00" | IV, 11
| Vedi quanto adoro
| data-sort-value="text Vedi quanto adoro" | Vedi quanto adoro
| data-sort-value="1816-12-01" | December 1816
| Text by Metastasio, from Didone abbandonata II, 4; Aria for soprano and piano; Clean copy and three sketches; Last extant autograph with corrections by Salieri
|}

Lists of compositions by Franz Schubert
Compositions by Franz Schubert
Schubert